A Chinese kin, lineage or sometimes rendered as clan, is a patrilineal and patrilocal group of related Chinese people with a common surname sharing a common ancestor and, in many cases, an ancestral home.

Description
Chinese kinship tend to be strong in southern China, reinforced by ties to an ancestral village, common property, and often a common spoken Chinese dialect unintelligible to people outside the village. Kinship structures tend to be weaker in northern China, with clan members that do not usually reside in the same village nor share property.

Zupu—the genealogy book
A zupu is a Chinese kin register or genealogy book, which contains stories of the kin's origins, male lineage and illustrious members. The register is usually updated regularly by the eldest person in the extended family, who hands on this responsibility to the next generation. The "updating" of one's zupu is a very important task in Chinese tradition, and can be traced back thousands of years. After several generations, the local clan lineage will often publish a compendium of these zupus. The overwhelming majority of zupus remain in private hands, though a large number may be found in the Peking University, Shanghai Library, Cornell University and Tōyō Bunko.

Chinese lineage associations

Chinese lineage associations, also kinship or ancestral associations ( or ), are a type of social relationship institutions found in Han Chinese ethnic groups and the fundamental unit of Chinese ancestral religion. They gather people who share the same surname belonging to the same kin, who often have the same geographical origin (ancestral home), and therefore the same patron deities. They aren't seen as distinct from the Chinese kin itself, but rather as its corporate form. These institutions and their corporeal manifestations are also known as lineage churches or kinship churches, or, mostly on the scholarly level, as Confucian churches, although this term has principally other different meanings.

Chinese kinship associations are the corporate forms of kins and the fundamental unit of Chinese ancestral religion. They provide guanxi (social network) to members and they build and manage ancestral shrines or temples dedicated to the worship of the progenitors of the kins as their congregational centers, where they perform rites of unity.

A lineage is a corporation, in the sense that members feel to belong to the same body, are highly conscious of their group identity, and derive benefits from jointly owned property and shared resources. Benefit derives from the surplus income of ancestral shrines and homes, which is reinvested by the managers or shared out in yearly dividends. Benefit of belonging to a lineage can also be measured in terms of protection and patronage. Ancestral temples also support local schools and engage in charitable work.

Different lineages may develop through the opposite processes of fusion and segmentation. They can also be dispersed and fragmented into "multi-lineage areas" or concentrated in one place, or "single-lineage area".

Ancestral shrine

Ancestral temples or shrines are the congregation places of lineage associations, by whom they are built and managed. These temples are devoted to the worship of the progenitors of a certain kin, where the kin members meet and perform rites of unity and banquets.

Variations

Consort kinship
In Imperial times, a consort kin was a kin with special status due to its connection with an emperor. Throughout Chinese history, consort kins have exercised great power at various times. There have been several usurpations of power by consorts, the most notable being the Han Dynasty's Empress Dowager Lü, the Tang Dynasty's Empress Wu, and the Qing Dynasty's Empress Dowager Cixi. The Han Dynasty usurper Wang Mang was a nephew of the Grand Empress Dowager Wang.

Qing period
During the Qing dynasty, the imperial government encouraged Chinese kins to take up some quasi-governmental functions such as those involving social welfare and primary education.

See also
 Chinese folk religion
 Confucianism
 Chinese ancestral worship
 Ancestral shrine & Ancestor tablets
 Chinese surname—Hundred Family Surnames
 Chinese lineage associations
 Ancestral home
 Guanxi
 Kongsi
 Xungen movement, the contemporary reconstruction of lineages in China
 Zupu

References

Citations

Sources

External links
Genealogy of clans of the indigenous people of Hong Kong 

Chinese culture
Chinese clans
Kinship and descent